Angle Tarn is a tarn in Cumbria, England, within the Lake District National Park, about a mile north-east of Hartsop. The lake is very distinctive in that it resembles a fish hook in shape. It contains two rocky islets and a small broken peninsula. It is located on the Angletarn Pikes, which are named after it.

This should not be confused with Angle Tarn (Langstrath), a smaller lake with the same name about 18.5 km to the north-east near Bowfell, also within the Lake District National Park.

Angle Tarn is a popular spot for overnight wild camping, especially on weekends and in the summer months. The tarn has been described by Alfred Wainwright as among the best of Lakeland tarns.

References

Lakes of the Lake District
Martindale, Cumbria